Pee Pee Creek is a stream in Pike County, Ohio, in the United States.

Pee Pee Creek derives its name from Major Paul Paine, a pioneer settler who added his initials to a tree which stood along its banks. Stones taken from Pee Pee Creek were used to construct the chimneys of pioneers' log cabins.

Pee Pee Creek is noted for muskellunge fishing.

The water from Pee Pee Creek flows into Crooked Creek in Ohio, a tributary of the Scioto River.

Location
Mouth: Confluence with the Scioto River south of Waverly at 
Source: Ross County at

See also
 Pee Pee Township, Pike County, Ohio
 List of rivers of Ohio

References

Rivers of Pike County, Ohio
Rivers of Ohio